The year 1928 in television involved some significant events.
Below is a list of television-related events during 1928.


Global television events

Births

Deaths
December 19 - J. Hartley Manners, 58, author of the first TV drama The Queen's Messenger

References